SSAP may refer to:

 Source Service Access Point, OSI network endpoint defined in IEEE 802.2
 Sequential structure alignment program, double dynamic programming method in Structural alignment
 Statements of Standard Accounting Practice, in Generally Accepted Accounting Principles (UK)
 Statement of Statutory Accounting Principles, for insurance in the United States
 Story Stem Assessment Profile, method for attachment measures
 SSAP, ICAO code for Apucarana Airport (APU), Paraná state, Brazil